Ray Edwards (born June 11, 1970) is a Canadian ice hockey coach and former professional  player.

Early life and playing career
Born in 1970 in Hanover, Ontario, Edwards played the majority of his minor hockey in Wasaga Beach. Edwards played major junior hockey in the Ontario Hockey League. He began his professional career during the 1991–92 season with the Dayton Bombers of the ECHL. He went on to play 309 games in the ECHL, racking up 1,253 minutes in penalties and 174 points, before hanging up his skates to pursue a coaching career following the 1997–98 season.

Coaching and executive career
After three seasons as a player-assistant for the Huntington Blizzard, Edwards was hired as the team's head coach. He later served two seasons with the San Angelo Saints, where was the general manager and was named the Central Hockey League coach-of-the-year. He later spent six seasons combined as a head coach in the American Hockey League for the San Antonio Rampage and the Portland Pirates.

Edwards was serving as director of player development for the Calgary Flames, when appointed an assistant coach after the resignation of head coach Bill Peters in December 2019.

Career statistics

References

External links

1970 births
Living people
Anaheim Bullfrogs players
Belleville Bulls players
Birmingham Bulls (ECHL) players
Calgary Flames coaches
Canadian ice hockey coaches
Canadian ice hockey right wingers
Dayton Bombers players
Guelph Platers players
Huntington Blizzard players
Oklahoma Coyotes players
Ontario Junior Hockey League players
Owen Sound Platers players
Sudbury Wolves players